The Australian national cricket team toured South Africa in April 2000. They played 3 One Day Internationals.

Squads

LOI series summary

1st ODI

2nd ODI

3rd ODI

External links
 Cricinfo

References

2000 in Australian cricket
2000 in South African cricket
South African cricket seasons from 1970–71 to 1999–2000
1999–2000
International cricket competitions from 1997–98 to 2000